Lycidola is a genus of longhorn beetles of the subfamily Lamiinae, containing the following species:

 Lycidola batesi Aurivillius, 1923
 Lycidola beltii Bates, 1872
 Lycidola expansa Bates, 1881
 Lycidola felix Waterhouse, 1880
 Lycidola flavofasciata Waterhouse, 1880
 Lycidola palliata (Klug, 1825)
 Lycidola popeba Galileo & Martins, 2006
 Lycidola simulatrix Bates, 1866

References

Hemilophini